Frank Bokas (13 May 1914 – November 1996) was a Scottish footballer. He played for Blackpool and Barnsley, spending the majority of his career with the latter.

Career
Bellshill-born Bokas began his career with local non-league club Kirkintilloch Rob Roy. In 1935, he moved south of the border to join English club Blackpool. He made six Football League appearances for the Tangerines before joining Barnsley in 1936. He spent three years with the Tykes, making 89 League appearances and scoring four goals. At the end of World War II, he joined Carlisle United, but did not make any appearances for the club. He finished his career with Gainsborough Trinity and Grantham.

References

1914 births
1996 deaths
Footballers from Bellshill
Scottish footballers
Kirkintilloch Rob Roy F.C. players
Blackpool F.C. players
Barnsley F.C. players
Carlisle United F.C. players
Gainsborough Trinity F.C. players
Grantham Town F.C. players
Association football wing halves